The men's 4 × 200 metre freestyle relay event at the 2014 Commonwealth Games as part of the swimming programme took place on 27 July at the Tollcross International Swimming Centre in Glasgow, Scotland.

The medals were presented by Kalam Juman-Yassin, Commonwealth Games Federation regional vice-president, Americas, and president of the Guyana Olympic Association and the quaichs were presented by Morake Raleaka, secretary general of the Lesotho National Olympic Committee.

Records
Prior to this competition, the existing world and Commonwealth Games records were as follows.

The following records were established during the competition:

Results

Heats

Final

References

Men's 4 x 200 metre freestyle relay
Commonwealth Games